The Battle of Chmielnik occurred on 18 March 1241 during the Mongol invasion of Poland. It ended in the defeat of the Polish armies of Sandomierz and Kraków provinces. The Mongols were able to move unimpeded, and plunder the abandoned city of Kraków.

Background

The Mongols invaded Poland in late 1240, and were advancing westwards; they crossed the frozen Vistula river and defeated the Poles in Tursko and Sandomierz on February 13, 1241. Then, the Mongol forces split into two or three armies, the main of which, under Baidar, was heading towards Kraków (Cracow), a large city (and capital of the fragmented Polish Kingdom) in central-southern Poland. Two other Mongol commanders, Kadan and Orda Khan, were advancing more to the north.

Battle
Details of the battle were recorded in the chronicles of Jan Długosz. Incidentally, the oldest mention of the town Chmielnik dates to the battle. In 1241, it was a village (Chmielnik would gain city rights only in the mid-16th century).

Polish forces were commanded by Włodzimierz, voivode (palatine) of Kraków, and Pakosław, voivode of Sandomierz, and represented most of Polish knights from these two provinces (the Kraków Province, also known as the Seniorate Province, and the Sandomierz Province) of fragmented Poland. The Mongols were commanded by Baidar. The Duke of Kraków. Bolesław V the Chaste, withdrew prior to the battle and did not participate. Bolesław's escape damaged the morale of the army, and caused many others to withdraw as well, weakening the forces available to Włodzimierz and Pakosław.

While the Polish forces had the advantage in the first phase of the battle, the Mongols, seeing that they would not defeat the Poles in straight combat, feigned a retreat.  When the Polish forces began to pursue them, they were hit by the Mongols' reinforcements and defeated comprehensively. Polish casualties were very heavy (Norman Davies wrote: "At Chmielnik, the assembled nobility of Malopolska perished to a man"); Włodzimierz and Pakosław were slain, as were Castellan of Kraków Klement of Brzeźnica and Castellan of Sandormierz Jakub Raciborowicz.

Aftermath
Having withdrawn from the fighting, Bolesław escaped to Moravia. With the defeat of the Polish army, panic spread through the nearby Polish lands. Kraków, one of the largest and most prosperous cities of Poland, was abandoned, as inhabitants fled, and the Mongols spent several days pillaging it and the neighboring hamlets (accounts vary on how soon after the battle Mongols entered the city, but it is certain they burned it by 24 March).

In the modern town of Chmielnik there is a monument dedicated to this battle.

Notes

1241 in Europe
Chmielnik
Chmielnik
1241 in the Mongol Empire